Forty Guns is a 1957 American Western film written and directed by Samuel Fuller, filmed in black-and-white CinemaScope and released by the 20th Century Fox studio. The film stars Barbara Stanwyck, Barry Sullivan and Gene Barry.

Plot
In the 1880s, Griff Bonnell, and his brothers, Wes and Chico, arrive in the town of Tombstone in Cochise County, Arizona. Griff is a reformed gunslinger, now working for the Attorney General's office, looking to arrest Howard Swain for mail robbery.

Swain is one of landowner Jessica Drummond's forty hired guns. She runs the territory with an iron fist, permitting the town to be terrorized and trashed by her brother, Brockie Drummond, and his boys. Brockie is an arrogant drunk and bully, but he goes too far by shooting vision-impaired town Marshal, Chisolm in the leg. Thereupon, Brockie and his drunken friends start trashing the town.

Griff intervenes and pistol-whips Brockie with a single blow while Wes covers him with a rifle from the gunsmith shop. Aware of how close Brockie is to his sister, Griff makes it a point not to crack Brockie's skull. Jessica delivered Brockie when their mother gave birth for the last time.

Wes falls in love with Louvenie Spanger, the daughter of the town gunsmith, so he decides to settle down and become the town's marshal. Griff becomes romantically involved with Jessica after she is dragged by a horse during a tornado.

Two of Jessica's forty dragoons, Logan, and Savage, attempt an ambush of Griff in an alley. He is saved by youngest brother Chico, who was supposed to be leaving for California for a new life on a farm. Chico's shot kills Savage, after which Jessica's brother and hired guns try to turn the town against the Bonnell brothers.

On his wedding day, Wes is gunned down by Brockie, who is really aiming at Griff (who leans forward to kiss the bride, thereby unknowingly saving himself). Brockie is jailed for the murder. He tries to escape by using his sister as a shield, daring Griff to shoot, and is shocked when Griff does exactly that. Griff's expertly-placed bullet merely wounds Jessica, and the cowardly Brockie then becomes the first man Griff has had to kill in ten years. Brockie's last words are "Mr. Bonnell, I'm killed!"

Chico remains behind to take the marshal's job. Griff rides out, certain that Jessica hates him for killing her brother, but she runs down the dirt street after his buckboard – repeatedly calling out "Griff! Mr. Bonnell!" – and they appear to ride off together for California.

Cast
 Barbara Stanwyck as Jessica Drummond
 Barry Sullivan as Griff Bonnell
 Gene Barry as Wes Bonnell
 Robert Dix as Chico Bonnell
 Dean Jagger as Sherriff Ned Logan
 John Ericson as Brockie Drummond
 Hank Worden as Marshal John Chisholm
 Jidge Carroll as Barney Cashman
 Paul Dubov as Judge Macy
 Gerald Milton as Shotgun Spanger
 Ziva Rodann as Rio
 Neyle Morrow as Wiley
 Chuck Roberson as Howard Swain
 Chuck Hayward as Charlie Savage
 Sandy Wirth as Chico's Girlfriend
 Eve Brent as Louvenia Spanger

Production
Fuller uses every opportunity to show off the widescreen format while employing extensive use of close-ups and one of the longest tracking shots ever done at Fox’s studio at that time – over three minutes long.

Harry Sukman composed the score and conducted it as well. Jidge Carroll sings two songs onscreen in the film, the theme song titled "High Ridin' Woman," written by Harold Adamson and Harry Sukman; and "God Has His Arms Around Me," written by Victor Young and Harold Adamson. Both songs were later recorded by the western singing group, The Sons of the Pioneers, and released on their single for RCA (RCA 47-7079) on November 1, 1957.

Fuller later repeatedly claimed that the ending he wanted involved Griff killing Jessica to get Brockie and the studio overruled him.  The available script copies, written by Fuller, have the same ending as the film, so there is no way to independently confirm this, but it's considered likely Fuller meant what he said, and went along with the studio heads so the film could get made.

Reception
The film has received critical acclaim from modern day critics. Rotten Tomatoes gives a score of 90% based on 20 reviews, with an average score of 8/10.

See also
 List of American films of 1957

References

External links
 
 
 
 
 
 Forty Guns: High-Riding Woman an essay by Lisa Dombrowski at the Criterion Collection

1958 films
1957 Western (genre) films
20th Century Fox films
American Western (genre) films
1950s English-language films
Films directed by Samuel Fuller
Films scored by Harry Sukman
Films set in the 1880s
Films set in Arizona
Revisionist Western (genre) films
1957 drama films
1957 films
1958 drama films
CinemaScope films
1950s American films